Claude Audran the Elder (1597 – 18 November 1675) was a French engraver.

Audran the brother (or, as some say, the cousin) of Charles Audran, was born in Paris. After receiving some instruction from Charles, he moved to Lyons, where he died in 1677. It  is uncertain whether or not he visited Rome. His engravings, which are signed either "Claude Audran", or "Cl. Audran", are executed in the manner of Cornelis Cort and F. Villamena. They are mostly portraits and allegories. He left three sons, Germain, Claude the younger, and Gérard.

References
 

1597 births
1675 deaths
17th-century French engravers
Engravers from Lyon